Charles Boede "Tex" Leyendecker (February 3, 1906 – June 24, 1988) was an American football tackle in the National Football League. He was a member of the inaugural Philadelphia Eagles football team in 1933. Leyendecker played for Dan McGugin's Vanderbilt Commodores football teams, twice selected All-Southern.

References

1906 births
1988 deaths
American football tackles
Philadelphia Eagles players
Vanderbilt Commodores football players
All-Southern college football players
People from Columbus, Texas
Players of American football from Texas